The Satellite Award for Best Visual Effects is one of the annual Satellite Awards given by the International Press Academy.

Winners and nominees

1990s

2000s

2010s

2020s

References

External links	
 Official website

Visual Effects
Film awards for Best Visual Effects